Oliver Geissen (born 21 August 1969) is a German television presenter. He was born in Hamburg. From 1999 to 2009, he was talk show host in Die Oliver Geissen Show on German broadcaster RTL. He also presents the music show Die ultimative Chartshow on RTL.

He married twice. In 2009, he married German actress Christina Plate. He has three sons.

References

External links 
 Official website by Oliver Geissen
 Spiegel: In den Fängen der Spasskraken (in German)

German television talk show hosts
German game show hosts
1969 births
People from Hamburg
Living people
RTL Group people
ZDF people